In geometry, the elongated pentagonal pyramid is one of the Johnson solids. As the name suggests, it can be constructed by elongating a pentagonal pyramid by attaching a pentagonal prism to its base.

Formulae 

The following formulae for the height, surface area and volume can be used if all faces are regular, with edge length :

Dual polyhedron 

The dual of the elongated pentagonal pyramid has 11 faces: 5 triangular, 1 pentagonal and 5 trapezoidal. It is topologically identical to the Johnson solid.

See also 
 Elongated pentagonal bipyramid

References

External links
 

Johnson solids
Self-dual polyhedra
Pyramids and bipyramids